The 2014 Prime League was the 17th season since the establishment of the Prime League, the reserve league of the top-tier S.League.

The league is also known as the Great Eastern YEO'S Prime League due to sponsorship reasons.

The season started on 1 March, and finished on 26 October.

Balestier Khalsa were the defending champions.

League table

Results

First and second round

Third round

Season statistics

Goalscorers

References

2014 domestic association football leagues
1